Carry on Admiral (released in the United States as The Ship Was Loaded) is a 1957 British comedy film directed by Val Guest and featuring David Tomlinson and Ronald Shiner; Joan Sims, who later became prominent in the Carry On series, has a small part. It predates and was not part of the Carry On series, and does not share any regular cast members beyond Sims, though it is similar in tone and style to the earliest films in the series.  Joan Hickson also made an appearance in this film and a few films in the Carry On series.  It was based on the 1947 stage play Off the Record, written by Ian Hay.

Plot
In the course of a drunken reunion, two old friends (one a junior Government minister, the other a Royal Navy officer in uniform about to take command for the first time) switch clothes before passing out. Next morning, their changed clothes result in a series of cases of mistaken identity. The film follows the efforts of each to reunite himself with his own destiny.

Cast
David Tomlinson as Tom Baker
Peggy Cummins as Susan Lashwood
Brian Reece as Peter Fraser
Eunice Gayson as Jane Godfrey
A. E. Matthews as Admiral Sir Maximillian Godfrey, K.C.B.
Joan Sims as Mary, a chambermaid
Lionel Murton as Psychiatrist
Reginald Beckwith as Receptionist
Desmond Walter-Ellis as Willy Oughton-Formby
Ronald Shiner as Salty Simpson
Peter Coke as Lt. Lashwood
Derek Blomfield as Lt. Dodson
Tom Gill as Petty Officer
 Sam Kydd as Attendant
The fictional ship HMS Sherwood in the film is played by a Daring-class destroyer. Other ships shown include the battleship  and the frigate  during the title sequence, two Dido-class cruisers in early background scenes, and a Loch-class frigate during the closing credits. Several scenes were filmed in Admiralty House, in Portsmouth Naval Base.

Reception
According to Kinematograph Weekly the film was "in the money" at the British box office in 1957.

References

External links
 

1957 films
1957 comedy films
1950s English-language films
Films directed by Val Guest
British comedy films
Films based on works by Ian Hay
1950s British films